Gerald David Lorge (July 9, 1922February 14, 2001) was an American lawyer and Republican politician.  He served 30 years in the Wisconsin State Senate, representing Outagamie and Waupaca counties, and earlier served four years in the State Assembly.  At the time of his death, he was the fifth longest-serving member of the Wisconsin Senate.

Early life 
Born in Bear Creek, Outagamie County, Wisconsin, Lorge graduated from Bear Creek High School and worked briefly at the YMCA before the outbreak of World War II.  In 1942, he enlisted for service in the United States Marine Corps and, in 1943, was deployed to the Pacific theater with the 4th Marine Aircraft Wing.  In early 1944, he was injured and spent several weeks at a naval hospital on Samoa.  Afterward, he was reassigned to San Diego, California, and subsequently received an honorable discharge.

Career

Lorge was one of three Republicans challenging incumbent Assemblymember William M. Rohan in the 1950 primary.  Rohan had long been a member of the Democratic Party, but had run as a Republican since 1946, after the collapse of the Wisconsin Progressive Party.  Lorge prevailed in the four-way primary, and won the general election with 59% of the vote, with Rohan in the race as an independent candidate.  Rohan returned for a head-to-head contest in the 1952 Republican primary, but Lorge prevailed again.

In 1946, he had begun attending Marquette University but did not complete a degree before being elected to the Wisconsin State Assembly.  Following the end of the spring 1951 legislative session, however, he returned to Marquette and received his J.D. in 1952.  He started a law practice in Bear Creek that year, and was re-elected to the Assembly that Fall.

In 1954, State Senator Gordon A. Bubolz resigned, necessitating a 1954 special election to fill the remaining two years of his term.  Lorge won a contested Republican primary and was unopposed in the November election.  He was subsequently elected to a full term in 1956, and was re-elected six more times.

After the death of U.S. Senator Joseph McCarthy in 1957, Lorge ran in the Republican primary to serve out the remainder of his term, but came in a distant 6th place.

In 1974, Lorge made another attempt at statewide election, running for Attorney General of Wisconsin.  He was unopposed for the Republican nomination, but lost the general election to Bronson La Follette, who was returning to the office he had previously held in the 1960s.

In the 1980s, Wisconsin underwent a painful redistricting process as the Governor and Legislature were unable to agree on a map.  The issue was referred to federal courts, and a court-ordered map was implemented in 1982.  Prompted by the court's map, which eviscerated existing legislative districts, the Legislature came back and agreed on a replacement map in 1983.  After these edits, Lorge's 14th State Senate district had been radically redrawn.  For the previous 30 years, the district had been anchored on his native Outagamie County and neighboring Waupaca County.  In 1983, the district now barely contained any of Outagamie County, and stretched all the way across central Wisconsin to Monroe County.

Rather than run for another term in the mangled district, Lorge, who was then the most senior member of the State Senate, chose to retire.  His son, William, attempted a run in the new Senate district, but was defeated in the Republican primary by Waupaca businessman Joseph Leean.

After leaving the Senate, Lorge made one final bid for elected office in 1985, running for Wisconsin circuit court judge in Outagamie County, but was defeated in the primary.

Lorge devoted more time to his law practice after leaving public office, and welcomed his son, Robert, as a partner in the firm, now known as Lorge & Lorge.

Personal life 
He married Christina "Tina" Ziegler in 1958.  Together, they had two sons and three daughters.  William served five terms in the Wisconsin State Assembly.  Robert was the Republican nominee in the 2006 United States Senate election in Wisconsin, but lost to incumbent senator Herb Kohl.

Lorge died at his home in Bear Creek, Wisconsin, in February 2001.

Electoral history

Wisconsin Assembly (1950, 1952)

U.S. Senate (1957)

| colspan="6" style="text-align:center;background-color: #e9e9e9;"| Republican Primary, July 30, 1957

Wisconsin Attorney General (1974)

| colspan="6" style="text-align:center;background-color: #e9e9e9;"| General Election, November 5, 1974

Wisconsin Senate (1954–1980)

Outagamie County Circuit Judge (1985)

| colspan="6" style="text-align:center;background-color: #e9e9e9;"| Nonpartisan Primary, February 19, 1985 (top-two)

References

1922 births
2001 deaths
People from Outagamie County, Wisconsin
Marquette University alumni
Marquette University Law School alumni
Wisconsin lawyers
Republican Party members of the Wisconsin State Assembly
Republican Party Wisconsin state senators
Military personnel from Wisconsin
United States Marines
United States Marine Corps personnel of World War II
20th-century American politicians
20th-century American lawyers